Brain Tumor Awareness Month or Brain Cancer Awareness Month is observed each March in the UK, and every May in Canada, Australia and the United States.

Events 
Gray ribbons are used to raise awareness of brain tumors including brain cancer. A one minute silence is held on 11am on the first Monday of March in the United Kingdom.

Some people wear gray clothes for "Turn May Grey".  Fundraising walks, races and other events  took place throughout the month.

History
Brain Tumor Awareness Month began in 2008 in the United States.

Related observances
Glioblastoma Awareness Day began in the United States on July 17, 2019, the year after politician John McCain passed away from Glioblastoma.

See also 
 John McCain

References 

Observances in the United States
March observances
May observances
Awareness ribbon
Brain cancers
Brain tumor
Cancer awareness
Head and neck cancer
Observances in Australia
Observances in the United Kingdom
Month-long observances in Canada
Health in Canada